The Cagayan Valley Rising Suns were a professional men's volleyball team. The team was owned by the family of Alvaro Antonio (governor of the Province of Cagayan, 2007 to 2016) and was managed by his daughter, Criselda Antonio (the incumbent mayor of Alcala, Cagayan and provincial sports coordinator for the Province of Cagayan), herself, a former volleyball player.

Team Colors
Main: Maroon 
2nd: White 
3rd: Yellow

Current roster
For the Spikers' Turf 2015 First Conference:

Coaching staff
 Head Coach: Ernesto Pamilar
 Assistant Coach(s): Norman Miguel

Team Staff
 Team Manager: Criselda Antonio
 Team Utility: 

Trainers
 Trainers: Ariel Dela Cruz Jose Roque
 Strength and Conditioning Coach: Audrey Alano Kim Bejo

Honors

Team

Spikers' Turf

Others

Individual

See also
 Cagayan Rising Suns (men's basketball team)
 Cagayan Valley Lady Rising Suns (women's volleyball team)

References 

Men's volleyball teams in the Philippines
Spikers' Turf
2015 establishments in the Philippines
2015 disestablishments in the Philippines
Volleyball clubs established in 2015
Sports in Cagayan